Daryl McCormack (born 22 January 1993) is an Irish actor. He made his acting debut in the soap opera Fair City (2015–2016), and has since appeared in the BBC series Peaky Blinders (2019–2022) and the Apple TV+ series Bad Sisters (2022). His performance in the film Good Luck to You, Leo Grande (2022) earned him two British Academy Film Award nominations. His other films include Pixie (2019).

Early life and education
McCormack was born on 22 January 1993. He is the son of an Irish mother, Theresa McCormack, and an African-American father, Alfred Thomas, from Baltimore. His parents met one summer in California. His mother returned to Ireland upon getting pregnant and raised McCormack in Nenagh, County Tipperary. He maintains a good relationship with his paternal side, especially his grandfather Percy Thomas, who would visit and take McCormack out to the theatre.

McCormack attended Gaelscoil Aonach Urmhumhan and St. Joseph's CBS. He played basketball and participated in the Choral Society. He went on to study at the Dublin Institute of Technology's Conservatory and the Gaiety School of Acting, graduating with a Bachelor of Arts in drama 2014.

Career
Upon graduating in 2014, McCormack was cast in his first professional role in the play The Grapes of Wrath at the Project Arts Centre. The following year, he made his television debut in the RTÉ One soap opera Fair City as Pierce Devlin, a character he would play until 2016. Also in 2015, he led Romeo and Juliet as Romeo at the Gate Theatre and starred as the titular Othello at the Theatre Royal Waterford.

McCormack made his West End debut in 2018 as Brendan in The Lieutenant of Inishmore. In his early career, he was almost cast in Star Wars: The Force Awakens. In 2019, McCormack starred alongside Olivia Cooke and Ben Hardy in Barnaby Thompson's comedy-thriller film Pixie and joined the cast of Peaky Blinders for its fifth series as Isaiah Jesus.

McCormack had a recurring role as Aram in the first season of the Amazon Prime fantasy series The Wheel of Time in 2021. In 2022, he starred as Matthew Claffin in Sharon Horgan's Apple TV+ series Bad Sisters and opposite Emma Thompson as the titular character of Sophie Hyde's film Good Luck to You, Leo Grande, the latter of which earned McCormack nominations for two British Academy Film Awards and a British Independent Film Award. McCormack has upcoming roles in the Belfast-set BBC series The Woman in the Wall and Alice Troughton's thriller film The Tutor.

Filmography

Film

Television

Music videos

Stage

Awards and nominations

References

External links 

1993 births
Living people
21st-century Irish actors
Actors from County Tipperary
Alumni of Dublin Institute of Technology
Black Irish people
Irish male film actors
Irish male Shakespearean actors
Irish male soap opera actors
Irish male stage actors
Irish male television actors
Irish people of African-American descent
People from Nenagh